Goodridge is a surname, and may refer to:

Augustus F. Goodridge (1839–1920), Canadian merchant and politician from Newfoundland
Bob Goodridge (born 1946), American football player
Elizabeth Goodridge (1798–1882), American miniaturist
David Goodridge, chef
Francie Kraker Goodridge, American track and field athlete
Gary Goodridge (born 1966), Trinidadian martial arts fighter
Gregory Goodridge (born 1971), Barbadian professional football player
Henry Goodridge (1797–1864), English architect
Henry Goodridge (politician) (1849–1914), Canadian politician
James Goodridge (1852–1900), Canadian politician
Jennifer Goodridge (born 1980), American musician
Jon Goodridge (born 1981), professional rugby union player
Laila Goodridge (born 1986), Canadian politician
Robin Goodridge (born 1965), British drummer
Sarah Goodridge (1788–1853), American painter
Sehon Goodridge (1937–2007), Anglican Bishop and author from Barbados
Stanley Goodridge (born 1928), Jamaican cricketer
Theodore Goodridge Roberts (1877–1953), Canadian novelist and poet
Vernon Goodridge (born 1984), American professional basketball player
William C. Goodridge (1806-1873), American businessman and Underground Railroad stationmaster
William M. Goodridge (1777–1833), American organ builder who changed his family name to "Goodrich"